Phaustin Baha Sulle (born 30 May 1982 in Arusha) is a Tanzanian long-distance runner who specializes in the half marathon and marathon. He won the silver medal at the 2000 World Half Marathon Championships. In 1999 he won the Paris Half Marathon and set a course record at the Marseille-Cassis Classique Internationale.

Achievements

Personal bests
Half marathon - 1:00:05 (2000)
Marathon - 2:10:08 (2004)

References

External links

marathoninfo

1982 births
Living people
Tanzanian male marathon runners
Tanzanian male long-distance runners